The 2020 Cork Senior A Hurling Championship was the first staging of the Cork Senior A Hurling Championship since its establishment by the Cork County Board. The draw for the group stage placings took place on 19 November 2019. The championship was scheduled to begin in April 2020, however, it was postponed indefinitely due to the impact of the COVID-19 pandemic on Gaelic games. The championship began on 31 July 2020 and ended on 4 October 2020.

On 4 October 2020, Charleville won the championship after a 3-12 to 1-14 win over Fr. O'Neill's in the final at Páirc Uí Chaoimh. This was their first championship title in the grade.

Charleville's Darragh Fitzgibbon was the championship's top scorer with 2-51.

Format change

On 26 March 2019, three championship proposals were circulated to Cork club delegates. A core element running through all three proposals, put together by the Cork GAA games workgroup, was that there be a group stage of 12 teams and straight relegation and promotion. On 2 April 2019, a majority of 136 club delegates voted for Option A which would see one round of games played in April, with two more following in August – all with county players available.

Team changes

To Championship 
Regraded from the Cork Senior Hurling Championship

 Ballymartle
 Bandon
 Bride Rovers
 Charleville
 Kanturk
 Killeagh
 Newcestown

Promoted from the Cork Premier Intermediate Hurling Championship

 Cloyne
 Fermoy
 Fr. O'Neill's
 Kilworth
 Mallow

Participating teams

Group A

Table

Results

Group B

Table

Results

Group C

Table

Results

Knockout stage

Bracket

Relegation playoff

Quarter-finals

Semi-finals

Final

Championship statistics

Top scorers

Overall

In a single game

Match records

Widest winning margin: 20 points
Fr. O'Neill's 6-19 - 2-11 Ballymartle (Group Stage Round 3)
Most goals in a match: 8
Fr. O'Neill's 6-19 - 2-11 Ballymartle (Group Stage Round 3)
Most points in a match: 44
Bandon 1-22 - 1-22 Mallow (Group Stage Round 3)
Cahrleville 2-26 - 3-18 Kanturk (semi-final)
Most goals by one team in a match: 6
Fr. O'Neill's 6-19 - 2-11 Ballymartle (Group Stage Round 3)
Most goals scored by a losing team: 4
Glen Rovers 4-18 - 4-26 Blackrock (Final)
Most points scored by a losing team: 20 
Kilworth 2-20 - 3-18 Killeagh (Relegation playoff)

Miscellaneous

 The relegation play-off match between Killeagh and Kilworth was originally scheduled to take place on 13 September but was postponed after one of the Killeagh players tested positive for COVID-19.

References

External links
 Cork GAA website

Cork Senior A Hurling Championship
Cork
Cork Senior A Hurling Championship
Cork Championship